Bård Bjerkeland (born 8 December 1961) is a Norwegian footballer. He played in three matches for the Norway national football team from 1986 to 1987.

References

External links
 
 

1961 births
Living people
Norwegian footballers
Norway international footballers
Place of birth missing (living people)
Association football defenders
Lillestrøm SK players
1. FC Nürnberg players
Lyn Fotball players
Norwegian expatriate footballers
Expatriate footballers in Germany